Following is a list of musical artists appearing on the ROIR record label, also known as Reach Out International Records, the New York City-based record label founded in 1979 by Neil Cooper.

Artists

External links
 Official site

ROIR artists
Lists of musicians